Acacia argutifolia, commonly known as the East Barrens wattle, is a shrub belonging to the genus Acacia and the subgenus Phyllodineae.

Description
It blooms from July to December and produces yellow flowers. The pungent phyllodes are mostly patent with a straight or shallowly recurved shape. The inflorescences are simple with one per axil. Seed pods are biconvex and shallowly constricted between seeds. The shrub is similar to Acacia simulans.

Distribution
It is native to a small area in the Fitzgerald River National Park in Great Southern regions of Western Australia. It grows in shallow sand over quartzite among low open heath, shrubland and mallee communities.

Classification
The species was first formally described by the botanist Bruce Maslin in 1976 as part of the work Studies in the genus Acacia (Mimosaceae) - Miscellaneous new phyllodinous species published in the journal Nuytsia. The only known synonym is Racosperma argutifolium as described by Leslie Pedley in 2003.

See also
 List of Acacia species

References

argutifolia
Acacias of Western Australia
Plants described in 1976
Taxa named by Bruce Maslin